is a Japanese dessert often found at Japanese festivals as well as outside Japan, in countries such as Taiwan and South Korea.

 were first sold near the Kanda's Imagawabashi Bridge during the An'ei era (1772–1781) of the Edo period (1603–1867). The name  originates from this time.

Various names 

 have been known by various names throughout different eras. Names also vary regionally, and some varieties sold only in certain stores have their own names.

  – Kansai region. 
  or  – Kansai and Kyūshū region.
 
 
 
 
  or 
 
 
 
  or  

By store or company 
  – product name for  produced by Gozasōrō Inc, established in 1950 in Himeji. It means "thank you for the purchase" in an archaic style.
  – product name for produced by Sawai Honpo Inc in Ehime. It originates in Higiri jizō near the Matsuyama Station.
 – product name for  used by the Fuji Ice shop in Nagano.

Historical and inactive 
  – in the song on the occasion of the revival after the Great Kantō earthquake in 1923, is mentioned that  was renamed .

Taiwan
 were introduced to Taiwan during the period of Japanese rule in Taiwan and are now a traditional snack in Taiwan. They are commonly called "red bean (i.e. azuki) cakes". However, some of the older generation may directly use the Japanese term , and in the greater Taipei area, they are also referred to as "wheel cakes".

South Korea

Malaysia

Philippines
The Filipino counterpart, locally known as "Japanese cakes", are similar to  but of a smaller serving size and are usually filled with cheese slices. This inexpensive snack is commonly found sold on special tricycle carts that have a built-in custom-made circular cooking mold. Other fillings are also available with sweet (strawberry, chocolate) and savory (ham and cheese) fillings.

See also 
 Egg waffle
  – egg sponge cake

References

External links 
  "Between Kaiten'yaki, Ōban'yaki and Imagawayaki" by Tsutomu Kushima. He is an investigator of the popular culture of Shōwa period.
  Nijyūyaki Jōhō
  Gozasōrō Inc.

Wagashi
Cakes
Stuffed desserts